

Team totals

Highest team total

Batting

Most runs in the tournament

 Note : Only top ten players shown.

Highest individual scores

Highest partnerships of the tournament
The partnership of Bates/Tiffen is the highest partnership in all the world cups

Highest partnerships of the tournament by wicket

Bowling

Most Wickets

 Note: Only top ten are shown. Sorted by wickets then bowling average.

Best bowling

Fielding

Most Catches

Wicketkeeping

Most Dismissals

References

stats